Purnima Neeraj Singh (born 21 November 1985) is an Indian politician who is serving as a Member of the Jharkhand Legislative Assembly from the Jharia constituency in Dhanbad district. She was married to late Neeraj Singh, the ex-Deputy of Dhanbad.

Career 

She contested the 2019 Jharkhand State Assembly Polls from Jharia as a Mahagathbandhan and Indian National Congress candidate against her sister-in-law Ragini Singh, the wife of Sanjeev Singh an accused in the murder of her late husband Niraj Singh. Winning the elections by a margin of 12054 votes, her victory also marks a first for the Mahagathbandhan in the Jharia Assembly Seat.

Positions Held

References 

People from Dhanbad district
Indian National Congress politicians from Jharkhand
Jharkhand MLAs 2019–2024
1985 births
Living people